Dong-jun, also spelled Dong-joon, is a Korean masculine given name. Its meaning differs based on the hanja used to write each syllable of the name. There are 24 hanja with the reading "dong" and 34 hanja with the reading "joon" on the South Korean government's official list of hanja which may be registered for use in given names.

People with this name include:
Kim Dong-jun (politician), South Korean politician; see List of members of the South Korean Constituent Assembly, 1948–1950
 (born 1958), South Korean actor
Lee Dong-june (born 1967), South Korean composer
Lee Dong-jun (born 1974), stage name Lee Juck, South Korean singer
Lee Dong-jun (basketball) (born 1980), naturalised South Korean basketball player
Kim Dong-jun (born 1992), South Korean singer, member of ZE:A
Kim Dong-jun (footballer) (born 1994), South Korean football goalkeeper
Lee Dong-jun (footballer) (born 1997), South Korean football midfielder

Fictional characters with this name include:
Kang Dong-joon, in 1995 South Korean television series Asphalt Man

See also
List of Korean given names

References

Korean masculine given names